Hörup is a municipality in the district of Schleswig-Flensburg, in Schleswig-Holstein, Germany.

The town was first mentioned in 1472 as Horop (place where plenty of hay). Was southeast of the town until the early 20th Mined century bog iron.
Hörup was awarded as child, youth and family-friendly community.

References

External links

 Community Hörup

Municipalities in Schleswig-Holstein
Schleswig-Flensburg